This is the discography for American jazz musician Dave Liebman.

Discography

As leader 
 1970: Night Scapes with Carvel Six (CBS/Sony, 1975)
 1973: First Visit (Philips, 1973)
 1974: Lookout Farm (ECM, 1974)
 1974: Drum Ode (ECM, 1975)
 1975: Sweet Hands (A&M/Horizon, 1975)
 1976: Light'n Up, Please! (A&M/Horizon, 1977)
 1976-77: The Last Call (EGO, 1979)
 1978: Pendulum (Artists House, 1979) – live
 1978?: 8 Originals from the Seventies (JA, 1979) – education primer not playing
 1979: The Opal Heart featuring Mike Nock (44, 1979)
 1979: Dedications (CMP, 1980)
 1979: "Lieb": Close-Up (Contempo Vibrato, 1983)
 1979: What It Is (CBS/Sony, 1980)
 1980: If They Only Knew (Timeless, 1981)
 1981-82: Solo: Memories, Dreams and Reflections (PM, 1983)
 1982: Spirit Renewed with Bob Moses, Eddie Gómez (Owl, 1991)
 1984: Picture Show (PM, 1985)
 1985: Guided Dream with the Tolvan Big Band (Dragon, 1986)
 1985: The Loneliness of a Long Distance Runner (CMP, 1986)
 1987?: Homage to John Coltrane (Owl, 1987)
 1988: David Liebman Trio + One (Owl, 1988)
 1989: Time Line (Owl, 1990)
 1989: The Blessing of The Old, Long Sound (Innowo, 1990)
 1990-91: Classic Ballads (Candid, 1991)
 1992?: Looking For The Light (A Tribute To Chet Baker) (CCB, 1992)
 1992: Joy: The Music of John Coltrane (Candid, 1993)
 1995: Voyage (Evidence, 1996)
 1995: John Coltrane's Meditations (Arkadia Jazz, 1997)
 1995: Live at MCG (MCG, 2009) – live
 1996?: Return of the Tenor: Standards (Double-Time, 1996)
 1996: New Vista (Arkadia Jazz, 1997)
 1997?: The Elements: Water with Billy Hart, Cecil McBee & Pat Metheny (Arkadia Jazz, 1997)
 1999?: Monk's Mood (Double-Time 1999)
 2001: In a Mellow Tone (Zoho, 2004)
 2001?: The Unknown Jobim (Global Music Network, 2001)
 2001?: Liebman Plays Puccini: A Walk in the Clouds (Arkadia Jazz, 2001)
 2003?: Conversation (Sunnyside, 2003)
 2003?: Beyond the Line (OmniTone, 2003)
 2003: Lieb Plays Wilder (Daybreak, 2005)
 2004: The Distance Runner (hatOLOGY, 2005) – live at Jazzfestival Willisau
 2005-07: Live, As Always (Mama, 2010) – live compilation
 2006?: Back on the Corner (Tone Center, 2006)
 2007?: Blues All Ways (OmniTone, 2007)
 2008?: Further Conversations (True Azul, 2008)
 2008?: Negative Space (EmArcy, 2008)
 2008: Lieb Plays Weill with Jesse Van Ruller (Daybreak, 2009)
 2013?: Lieb Plays The Beatles (Daybreak, 2013)
 2013: Ceremony (Chesky, 2014)
 2013: Samsara (Whaling City Sound, 2014)
 2015: The Puzzle (Whaling City Sound, 2015)
 2014-16: Expansions Live (Whaling City Sound, 2016)[2CD] – live compilation
 2016: Fire (Jazzline, 2018)
 2018?: To My Masters (Vaju, 2018)[CDR]

As co-leader 
 1975: Father Time with Frank Tusa et al. (Enja, 1975)
 1975: Forgotten Fantasies with Richie Beirach (Horizon/A&M, 1976)
 1978: Mosaic Select: Pendulum - Live At The Village Vanguard with Randy  et al. (Mosaic, 2008)[3CD] – live
 1978: Omerta with Richie Beirach (Trio, 1978)
 1982: Earth Jones with Elvin Jones (Palo Alto, 1982)
 1985: Double Edge with Richie Beirach (Storyville, 1987)
 1985: The Duo: Live with Richie Beirach (Advance music, 1991) – live
 1988?: The Energy of the Chance with Dave Love (Heads Up, 1988)
 Inner Voices with Abbey Rader (Abray, 1997)
 Suite for Soprano Sax and String Orchestra with Florian Ross (Naxos, 1999)
 Cosmos with Abbey Rader (Cadence, 2003) – live recorded in 2001
 Manhattan Dialogues with Phil Markowitz (Zoho, 2005) – recorded in 2004
 Flashpoint with Anthony Jackson, Steve Smith, Aydin Esen (Mascot, 2005)
 Duologue with Mike Nock (Birdland, 2007)
 Re-Dial: Live In Hamburg with Richie Beirach, Ron McClure, Billy Hart (Outnote, 2007) – live
 New Light - Live in Oslo (PM, 2007) – live
 Waters Ashore with LaDonna Smith, Misha Feigin (Trans Museq, 2007)
 Quest for Freedom with Richie Beirach (Sunnyside, 2010)
 Lineage with Michael Stephans (Whaling City Sound, 2013)
 The Fallout of Dreams with Steve Dalachinsky (Rogueart, 2014) – recorded in 2011
 Blue Rose with John Stowell (Origin, 2014) – recorded in 2012
 Media Luz with Jean-Marie Machado, Claus Stötter, Quatuor Psophos (La Buissonne, 2014) – live recorded in 2012 & 14
 The Miami Jazz Project with Arthur Barron, Abel Pabon (Zoho, 2014)
 Sketches of Aranjuez with Saudades Jazz Orchestra (PAO, 2015)
 Distant Song with Fred Farell (Whaling City Sound, 2018) – recorded in 2015
 Petite Fleur with John Stowell (Origin, 2018) – recorded in 2017
 The Unknowable with Tatsuya Nakatani, Adam Rudolph (RareNoise, 2018)
 Petite Fleur: The Music of Sidney Bechet with John Stowell (Origin, 2018) – recorded in 2017
 Chi with Adam Rudolph, Hamid Drake (RareNoise, 2019)
 Four Visions with  David Binney, Donny McCaslin, Samuel Blais (Sunnyside , 2019)
 On The Corner Live! with  Jeff Coffin, Victor Wooten, Chester Thompson, Chris Walters, James Dasilva (Ear Up, 2019)
 Live at Nozart with Robert Landfermann, Pablo Held, Christian Lillinger (Klaeng, 2019)
 Sound Desire with Romano Pratesi (Dodicilune, 2019) – recorded in 2012
 Journey Around The Truth with Andy Emler (Unknown, 2019)
 Mussorgsky Pictures Revisited with Kristjan Randalu (Budapest Music Center, 2020) – recorded in 2019
 The Rise Up with Mehmet Ali Sanlikol (Dunya, 2020) – recorded in 2019-20
 Masters In Paris with Martial Solal (Sunnyside, 2020) – recorded in 2016
 Quint5t with Randy Brecker, Marc Copland, Drew Gress, Joey Baron (InnerVoice Jazz, 2020)
 Invitation with Billy Test, Evan Gregor, Ian Froman (Albert Murray/John Aveni, 2021)

As a member 

Open Sky
 Open Sky (PM, 1973) – recorded in 1972
 Spirit in the Sky (PM, 1975)

Zytron
with James Zitro
 New Moon In Zytron (Pacific Arts, 1978)

Quest
 Quest (Trio, 1982) – recorded in 1981
 Quest II (Storyville, 1986) - Live
 Midpoint: Quest III (Storyille, 1988)
 N.Y. Nites: Standards (PAN Music/NEC Avenue, 1988)
 Natural Selection (Pathfinder/NEC Avenue, 1988)
 Of One Mind (CMP, 1990)
 Redemption; Quest Live in Europe (Hatology, 2007) - Live
 Re-Dial - Live In Hamburg (Outnote, 2007) - Live
 Circular Dreaming (enja, 2012) - recorded in 2011

Saxophone Summit
 Gathering of Spirits (Telarc, 2004)
 Seraphic Light with Joe Lovano, Ravi Coltrane (Telarc, 2008) – recorded in 2007
 Visitation (ArtistShare, 2014) – recorded in 2011
 Street Talk (Enja, 2019) – recorded in 2017

As sideman 

With Elvin Jones
 Genesis (Blue Note, 1971)
 Merry Go Round (Blue Note, 1972) – recorded in 1971
 Live at the Lighthouse (Blue Note, 1973)[2LP] – live recorded in 1972
 Mr. Jones (Blue Note, 1973) – recorded in 1972
 The Main Force (Vanguard, 1976)
 Live at Carnegie Hall (PM, 2018) – live recorded in 1972

With Miles Davis
 On the Corner (Columbia, 1972) – session of June 1, 1972 only
 Get Up with It (Columbia, 1974) – compilation. on 2 tracks.
 Dark Magus (CBS/Sony, 1977) – live recorded in 1974
 Berlin '73 (Jazz Masters, 1993) – unofficial
 Black Satin (Jazz Masters, 1994)[2CD] – unofficial
 Another Bitches Brew (Jazz Door, 1995)[2CD] – unofficial

With Terumasa Hino
 Journey to Air (Love, 1970) 
 City Connection (Flying Disc, 1979)

With Vic Juris
 Music of Alec Wilder (Double-Time, 1996)
 A Second Look (Mel Bay, 2005)

With Tom Harrell
 Sail Away (Contemporary, 1989)
 Visions (Contemporary, 1991) – recorded in 1987-90

With Teo Macero
 Impressions of Charles Mingus (Palo Alto, 1983)
 Acoustical Suspension (Doctor Jazz, 1985)

With Bob Moses
 Bittersuite in the Ozone (Mozown, 1975)
 Visit with the Great Spirit (Gramavision, 1984) – recorded in 1983
 The Story of Moses (Gramavision, 1987)[2LP]

With others
 Rez Abbasi, Snake Charmer (Earth Sounds, 2005)
 Jeff Berlin, In Harmony's Way (M.A.J., 2001) – live recorded in 2000
 Joanne Brackeen, Pink Elephant Magic (Arkadia Jazz, 1999)
 Randy Brecker, Peter Erskine, Tim Hagans, The Avatar Sessions (Fuzzy Music, 2009)
 Linc Chamberland, A Place Within (Muse, 1977)
 Jimmy Cobb, So Nobody Else Can Hear  (Contempo Vibrato, 1983) – recorded in 1981
 Aydin Esen, Anadolu (Columbia/Sony, 1992)
 Charles Evans, Subliminal Leaps (More Is More, 2013)
 Michael Franks, Tiger in the Rain (Warner Bros., 1979) – recorded in 1978
 Al Foster, Mr. Foster (Better Days, 1979)
 Kip Hanrahan, Coup De Tete (American Clave, 1981)
 Billy Hart, Rah (Gramavision, 1988)
 Phil Haynes, No Fast Food (CornerStoreJazz, 2014)
 Conrad Herwig, New York Breed (Double-Time, 1996)
 John Hollenbeck, No Images (CRI/Blueshift, 2001)
 Nobuyoshi Ino, Mountain (Nippon Columbia, 1981)
 David Kane, Drew Gress, Tony Martucci, Machinery of the Night (Magellan, 2006)
 Ryo Kawasaki Group, Nature's Revenge (MPS, 1978)
 Masabumi Kikuchi, Susto (CBS/Sony, 1981) – recorded in 1980-81
 Steve Masakowski, Mars (Prescription, 1983)
 Jill McManus Symbols of Hopi (Concord Jazz, 1984) – recorded in 1983
 Arnon Palty, Treasure Map (JazZone, 2012)
 Erin McDougald, Outside the Soiree (Miles High, 2017)
 Nellie McKay, Obligatory Villagers (Hungry Mouse, 2007)
 Jill McManus, Symbols of Hopi (Concord Jazz, 1984)
 Robert Musso, Innermedium (DIW, 1999)
 Esther Phillips, From a Whisper to a Scream (Kudu, 1971)
 Pete La Roca, SwingTime, SwingTime (Blue Note, 1997)
 Badal Roy, Passing Dreams (Geetika, 2002)
 Masahiko Satoh, All-In All-Out (CBS/Sony, 1979)
 John Scofield, Who's Who? (Arista Novus, 1979)
 John Stowell, The Banff Sessions (Origin, 2002)
 Ten Wheel Drive, Brief Replies (Polydor, 1970)
 Fred Tompkins, Somesville (F.K.T., 1975)
 T-Square and Friends, Miss You in New York (Sony, 1995)
 Kazumi Watanabe, Dogatana (Denon, 1981)

References

Discographies of American artists
Jazz discographies